Bothriogenys was a genus of anthracotheres that lived in Eastern Africa during the late Eocene to early Oligocene.  Most fossils have been found in Fayum, Egypt, but one species, B. orientalis, is known from late Eocene deposits in Thailand.

In life, they would have resembled hippopotamuses with small, elongated heads.

Anthracotheres
Oligocene even-toed ungulates
Eocene genus first appearances
Rupelian genus extinctions
Eocene mammals of Africa
Oligocene mammals of Africa
Fossil taxa described in 1913
Prehistoric even-toed ungulate genera